Barrackpore Lok Sabha constituency is one of the 543 parliamentary constituencies in India. The constituency centres on Barrackpore in West Bengal. All of the seven assembly segments of No. 15 Barrackpore Lok Sabha constituency are in North 24 Parganas district.

Overview

The Barrackpore constituency stretching from the north western edges of Kolkata metropolis in to the North 24-Parganas district is an industrial area with a difference -  "the eastern bank of the Hooghly here, from Barrackpore to Shyamnagar, is an expanse of chimneys that pierce the sky like a cardiogram…Smoke billows from only one or two of them. The Empire Jute Mill is at work on occasional weeks. Loomtex Cotton is shut. Naihati Jute is shut. Gouripore Jute, shut. The ordnance factories, Ishapore Rifle and Metal & Steel, are coping with dwindling orders for guns and bombs but their workers at least have a modicum of government security. Bengal Enamel and Mahaluxmi Cotton, both in Palta, are forgotten, their land having been sold for apartment blocks. Dunbar Cotton has sold its real estate. Lakkhi Cotton does not exist, private residential high-rises having already been built on its land. To the north, the Kakinada Paper Mill is shut, as is the Meghni Mill. Workers of Barrackpore’s sick industries lead measly lives."

More than half of the voters are from the working class and around 35% of them are Hindi-speaking.

Assembly segments
As per order of the Delimitation Commission in respect of the delimitation of constituencies in the West Bengal, parliamentary constituency no. 15 Barrackpore is composed of the following assembly segments from 2009:

Members of Parliament

Election results

General election 2019

General election 2014

General election 2009

|-
! style="background-color:#E9E9E9;text-align:left;" width=225 |Party
! style="background-color:#E9E9E9;text-align:right;" |Seats won
! style="background-color:#E9E9E9;text-align:right;" |Seat change
! style="background-color:#E9E9E9;text-align:right;" |Vote percentage
|-
| style="text-align:left;" |Trinamool Congress
| style="text-align:center;" | 19
| style="text-align:center;" | 18
| style="text-align:center;" | 31.8
|-
| style="text-align:left;" |Indian National Congress
| style="text-align:center;" | 6
| style="text-align:center;" | 0
| style="text-align:center;" | 13.45
|-
| style="text-align:left;" |Socialist Unity Centre of India (Communist)
| style="text-align:center;" | 1
| style="text-align:center;" | 1
| style="text-align:center;" | NA
|-
|-
| style="text-align:left;" |Communist Party of India (Marxist)
| style="text-align:center;" | 9
| style="text-align:center;" | 17
| style="text-align:center;" | 33.1
|-
| style="text-align:left;" |Communist Party of India
| style="text-align:center;" | 2
| style="text-align:center;" | 1
| style="text-align:center;" | 3.6
|-
| style="text-align:left;" |Revolutionary Socialist Party
| style="text-align:center;" | 2
| style="text-align:center;" | 1
| style="text-align:center;" | 3.56
|-
| style="text-align:left;" |Forward bloc
| style="text-align:center;" | 2
| style="text-align:center;" | 1
| style="text-align:center;" | 3.04
|-
| style="text-align:left;" |Bharatiya Janata Party
| style="text-align:center;" | 1
| style="text-align:center;" | 1
| style="text-align:center;" | 6.14
|-
|}

General election 2004

General election 1999

General elections 1951-2004
Most of the contests were multi-cornered. However, only winners and runners-up are mentioned below:

See also
 List of Constituencies of the Lok Sabha

References

External links
Barrackpur lok sabha  constituency election 2019 result details

Lok Sabha constituencies in West Bengal
Politics of North 24 Parganas district
Barrackpore